Andrés Recalde Miguez (5 June 1904 – 17 January 1956) was an Uruguayan boxer who competed in the 1924 Summer Olympics. In 1924 he was eliminated in the first round of the flyweight class after losing his fight to Gaetano Lanzi.

References

External links
Andrés Recalde's profile at Sports Reference.com

1904 births
1956 deaths
Flyweight boxers
Olympic boxers of Uruguay
Boxers at the 1924 Summer Olympics
Uruguayan male boxers